William Sanderson McCormick (November 2, 1815 – September 27, 1865) was an American businessman who developed the company that became the major producer of agricultural equipment in the 19th century. The business became the International Harvester corporation after his death.
Although he died relatively young with most of the fame going to his brothers, his extended McCormick family continued to be influential in the politics and business of Chicago.

Life
William Sanderson McCormick was born November 2, 1815 on the family estate known as Walnut Grove, in Virginia.
His father was Robert McCormick (1780–1846) and mother Mary Ann (Hall) McCormick.

He was educated in public schools and took an interest in business. When the family farm had financial problems in the panic of 1837, he took over its management and made it profitable again. When his father died in 1846, his older brother Cyrus McCormick and younger brother Leander J. McCormick left to start a factory to produce the mechanical reapers that had been developed on the farm, while he was left to take care of the estate.

Career
In 1850, William, his wife, and infant son moved to Chicago to join his brothers in the family business, first on a salary basis. The California Gold Rush had created a labor shortage, which was good for demand, but also caused turnover in the factory employees. William managed the day-to-day operations of the business while Cyrus was often traveling or pursuing patent infringement lawsuits. William tried to mediate between Cyrus (who claimed all the credit as "inventor") and his brother Leander, who was now in charge of technical aspects of product development.

In 1859, he negotiated a formal agreement giving him and Leander one fourth interest in the company, and renamed it "C. H. McCormick & Brothers."

The onset of the American Civil War brought new demand, but stress from another labor shortage. McCormick bought real estate in downtown Chicago which proved to be a wise investment. The family was attacked in the press as being southern sympathizers.  In fact, the family never adjusted to the brutal cold of winters in Chicago.  Brother Cyrus worsened the conflict by funding conservative newspapers to battle the liberal major publishers that were tied to local politicians. Cyrus traveled to Europe in 1864 where he successfully promoted international sales.

Personal life
He married Mary Ann Grigsby (1828–1878) on July 11, 1848, daughter of Virginia planter Reuben Grigsby of Hickory Hill plantation.  Together, William and Mary were the parents of five children:

 Robert Sanderson McCormick (1849–1919), who married the daughter of  Chicago Tribune publisher Joseph Medill. He served as U.S. Ambassador to Austria-Hungary, Russia and France.
 William Grigsby McCormick (1851–1941), who married Eleanor Brooks on October 23, 1873 and had seven children. He was one of the five founders of the Kappa Sigma Fraternity at the University of Virginia in 1869.
 Emma Louise McCormick (1854–1893), who married Wisconsin and Chicago judge, politician and railroad executive Perry H. Smith on June 18, 1878.
 Anna Reubenia "Ruby" McCormick (1860–1917), who married Edward Tyler Blair (1857–1939) on May 29, 1882.
 Lucy Virginia McCormick (1865–1928), who married lawyer Samuel Rountree Jewett (1862–1922), on October 9, 1888.

Outwardly, McCormick was described as "of a cheerful disposition, quick spoken, ... a most interesting and agreeable man". However, he suffered from "nervous dyspepsia" and his mental state deteriorated. Various treatments for his mental illness such as bland diets or water cures proved ineffective. In April 1865 he stated simply to Cyrus "I am extremely nervous". He continued to manage the business until checking into the Illinois State Asylum in Jacksonville, Illinois in August 1865.  He died there on September 27, 1865.  His widow cashed in her share of the business, moved back to Virginia, and left the children with their uncles in Chicago.  He was buried in Graceland Cemetery, and replaced as general manager by Charles A. Spring, Jr.

Descendants
Through his son Robert, he was the grandfather of Joseph Medill McCormick (1877–1925), a U.S. Senator from Illinois, and Robert R. McCormick (1880–1955), the publisher of the Tribune, which had been a major attacker of the family during the war.

Through his son William, he was the grandfather of Chauncey Brooks McCormick (1884–1954), and the great-grandfather of Brooks McCormick (1917–2006), who was the last McCormick to lead the family firm.

Through his daughter Ruby, he was the grandfather of financier William McCormick Blair (1884–1982) and great-grandfather of William McCormick Blair Jr. (1916–2015), who served as U.S. Ambassador to Denmark from 1961 to 1964 and as the Philippines from 1964 until 1967.

Family tree

References

External links
 
 

1815 births
1865 deaths
McCormick family
Businesspeople from Chicago
People from Virginia